The vice president of Greece was a senior administrative official during the republican phase of the Regime of the Colonels in 1973.

After the coup d'état of 21 April 1967, the Hellenic Parliament was dissolved and the nation was ruled by a series of far-right military juntas for the next seven years. Colonel Georgios Papadopoulos, the self-appointed Regent of Greece, abolished the Greek monarchy in June 1973 and declared himself President. Along with the new office of president, the office of vice president was also established and General Odysseas Angelis, then Chief of the Armed Forces, was chosen to occupy the seat.

After less than six months, the Papadopoulos regime was ousted by hardliner Brigadier Dimitrios Ioannidis, who installed General Phaedon Gizikis as the new (figurehead and not executive) president. The office of vice president, however, was abolished together with the 1973 Constitution following the regime change, and thus Angelis remains to date the only holder of the office of Vice President of Greece.

See also
Deputy Prime Minister of Greece

References 

Vice presidents of Greece
Politics of Greece
Government of Greece
1973 establishments in Greece
1973 disestablishments in Greece
Greek junta
Titles held only by one person